Philip Winston Pillsbury (April 16, 1903 – June 14, 1984) was chairman emeritus of the Pillsbury Company and a grandson of the cofounder, Charles Alfred Pillsbury.

Early life
Pillsbury was born in Minneapolis, Minnesota. His father, Charles S. Pillsbury, was a long-time company director. He graduated from The Hotchkiss School in 1920, and was a member of the Yale College Class of 1924. He was a starting guard on the undefeated and tie-free 1923 football team, an All-American water polo athlete, and a tenor for the Yale Glee Club. Pillsbury died from cancer at Abbott-Northwestern Hospital in Minneapolis.

Career
Pillsbury was elected to the board of directors in 1928; in 1940, he became president, and maintained that post after election to the chairmanship of the board in 1951.

Pillsbury started as a laborer at the company. He was a master miller before accepting promotion to sales and management positions. Pillsbury was said to be one of the few milling executives to have a real knowledge of flour milling.

Personal life 
Pillsbury married Eleanor Bellows Pillsbury in 1934. They had two children.

References

1903 births
1984 deaths
Businesspeople from Minneapolis
American chairpersons of corporations
American food industry business executives
Hotchkiss School alumni
Yale Bulldogs football players
Players of American football from Connecticut
Players of American football from Minnesota
Pillsbury family
Deaths from cancer in Minnesota
20th-century American businesspeople